Jam sandwich may refer to:
 Jam sandwich (food), a food item made from bread and jam
 Jam sandwich (police car), British slang for one style of police vehicle